Nora Township is the name of the following places in the U.S. state of Minnesota:

 Nora Township, Clearwater County, Minnesota
 Nora Township, Pope County, Minnesota

See also

 Nora Township (disambiguation)
 Nora (disambiguation)

Minnesota township disambiguation pages